Community manager may refer to:

 Community association manager, a person who manages a condominium or homeowners association
 Online community manager, a person who manages an online community

See also 
 Community management